Not related to Associated Motor Industries Sdn Bhd of Malaysia or the fictional National Motors Corporation.

Associated Motor Industries of Dayton, Ohio was founded in 1922. It was a merger of a number of existing automobile, truck, and parts manufacturers with the intention of standardising production and obtaining economies of scale. The company was renamed the National Motors Corporation in 1923. By 1924 it had ceased production.

Merged Companies
The companies initially involved were:
 National Motor Car and Vehicle Corporation, Indianapolis
 Covert Gear Corporation, Lockport, New York - transmission and clutch makers
 Recording and Computing Machines Company, Dayton, Ohio - ignition, magneto, starter, battery and generator manufacturers
 Jackson Motors Corporation, Jackson, Michigan
 Kentucky Wagon Manufacturing Company, Louisville, Kentucky - manufacturer of the Dixie Flyer
 Saginaw Sheet Metal Works, Saginaw, Michigan
 Traffic Motor Truck Corporation, St. Louis, Missouri
 Murray-Tregurtha Corporation, Boston, Mass - manufacturers of gasoline engines
 H F Holbrook Company, New York - manufacturers of automobile bodies.

Company Directors
The company officers were:
 Wilfred I Ohmer, Chairman of the Board - Recording and Computing Machines Company
 Louis Ruthenburg of Dayton, President - former General Manager of General Motors Delco Light plant
 Vice-Presidents
 Alwin (or Alvin) A Gloetzner, Lockport, New York - Covert Gear Corporation
 Robert V Board, Louisville, Kentucky - Kentucky Wagon Works
 Thoedore C Brandle, St Louis, Missouri - Traffic Motor Truck Corporation
 George M Dickson, Indianapolis - National Motor Car
Other Directors
 James R Duffin, Louisville - attorney
 Harry G. Stoddard, Worcester, Mass of Wyman-Gordon
 H V Hale, Saginaw, Michigan - Saginaw Sheet Metal Works
 H J Linkert, Dayton  
 C L Halliday, Jackson, Michigan
 W W Sterling, Jackson
 C L V Exselsen, Chicago
 Guy Wilson, St Louis - Traffic Motor Truck Corporation
 Buell Hollister, New York
 H F Hollister, New York
 M Douglas Flattery, Boston

Its Mission Statement 

At its commencement, the company stated that it intended to reduce prices without reducing wages, provide $35 million in dealers’ finance funding, employ 20 000 skilled mechanics, continue manufacturing all existing makes in greater numbers, and freight free anywhere east of the Rocky Mountains.

References

Defunct manufacturing companies based in Ohio
Defunct automotive companies of the United States
Defunct companies based in Dayton, Ohio
1922 establishments in Ohio
1924 disestablishments in Ohio
Vehicle manufacturing companies established in 1922
Vehicle manufacturing companies disestablished in 1924